Bastia Cathedral (Pro-cathédrale Sainte-Marie de Bastia) is a former Roman Catholic cathedral in Bastia on the island of Corsica. It has been listed since 2000 as a monument historique by the French Ministry of Culture.

The former Bastia Cathedral, dedicated to Saint Mary, was built from 1495 onwards, with major reconstruction at the beginning of the 17th century. Behind the church stands the chapel of  Sainte-Croix, known for its exuberantly decorated interior and for the figure of Christ des Miracles ("Christ of the Miracles"), venerated by the people  of Bastia, and discovered floating in the waters of the Mediterranean in 1428 by two fishermen.

References

External links
Location

Cathedrals in Corsica
History of Corsica
Former cathedrals in France
Monuments historiques of Corsica